Zanaco FC is a Zambian football club based in Lusaka that plays in the MTN/FAZ Super Division. They play their home games at Sunset Stadium in Lusaka. Zanaco Football Club was formed in 1978 as a social team by management trainees of Zambia National Commercial Bank. The team was launched at LOTUS INN in Lusaka. The founding members were Lloyd Choongo, Ben Banda, Nathan Lupupa and John Kasengele.
Starting from the 1980s, Zanaco started growing steadily from a mere social club to becoming one of the most successful and decorated club in Zambian football history.
Over the years the Sunset Stadium-based team has won 7 Super League trophies, 4 Charity Shields, 1 Coca-Cola Cup, 1 Mosi Cup and 3 BP Cups.
Zanaco are the only team outside of Zambia's Copperbelt Province to have not only won but also defended the Super League Trophy.

Zanaco stands for Zambia National Commercial Bank.

Achievements
Zambian Premier League: 7
2002, 2003, 2005, 2006, 2009, 2012, 2016
Runner up : 2001, 2015, 2017, 2021
Zambian Cup: 1
2002
Finalist : 1998
ABSA Cup: 1
2017
Finalist : 2010, 2016, 2019
Zambian Charity Shield: 4
2001, 2003, 2006, 2019
Zambian Challenge Cup: 3
1987, 1988, 2006
Zambian Coca-Cola Cup: 2
2001, 2004

Performance in CAF competitions
CAF Champions League: 8 appearances
2003 – First Round
2004 – Second Round
2006 – First Round
2007 – First Round
2010 – Last 16
2017 – Group Stage (Top 16)
2018 – First Round (Relegated to the Confederation Cup)
2022 - 

CAF Confederation Cup: 4 appearances
2010 – Group stage (Top 8)
2016 – Second Round
2018 – Pre-Group Stage
2020 – Quarter Final

CAF Cup: 2 appearances
2001 – First Round

CAF Cup Winners' Cup: 1 appearance
2002 – First Round

Club officials
Chairman:  David Musunga
General Manager-CEO:  Modest Hamalabbi
Administrative Officer:  Roy Mutombo
General Secretary:  Isaac Manda

Staff
Head Coach:  Kelvin Kaindu
Assistant Coach:  Henry Banda
Goalkeeper Coach:  Kennedy Kalale
Physical Trainer:  Thomson Matenda

Former managers
 Dan Kabwe
 George Mungwa(late)
 Wedson Nyirenda
 Fighton Simukonda(late) (2004–07)
 Wesley Mondo(late) (2007–08)
 Keagan Mumba (late) (2012–13)
 Aggrey Chiyangi
 Mumamba Numba
 Chris Kaunda
 kelvin Kaindu

References

External links
 Zanaco FC – Zanaco
 http://www.zanacofc.co.zm/ 

Football clubs in Zambia
Sport in Lusaka
Association football clubs established in 1985
1985 establishments in Zambia